Hungerfordia pelewensis is a species of small land snail with an operculum, a terrestrial gastropod mollusk in the family Diplommatinidae. This land snail is endemic to Palau.

References

External links 

Fauna of Palau
pelewensis
Endemic fauna of Palau
Taxonomy articles created by Polbot